Nguyễn Văn Vĩ (born 12 February 1998) is a Vietnamese professional football player who plays as a left-back for Hà Nội in V.League 1

Honours
Hồng Lĩnh Hà Tĩnh
V.League 2: 2019
Hà Nội
V.League 1: 2022
Vietnamese National Cup: 2022

External links

References

1998 births
Living people
Vietnamese footballers
Vietnam youth international footballers
Association football forwards
V.League 1 players